Ziegelbrücke is a village situated on both sides of the Linth Channel in Switzerland. Ziegelbrücke is shared by the municipalities  of Niederurnen in the canton of Glarus and Schänis in the canton of St. Gallen, with the Linth forming the boundary between these municipalities.

Name 
The name refers to a bridge covered by a roof with tiles. The presence of such a bridge was first documented in 1532.

This bridge was located approximately where the current bridge over the Linth Channel is nowadays. However, prior to the taming of the Linth (1807–1823), the River Linth ran west of Lake Walen (Walensee), and where the Linth Channel is today, there used to be a small river, the Maag, flowing out of Lake Walen and into the former River Linth. The old bridge was over the Maag.

Geography and political situation 

The village of Ziegelbrücke is divided by the Linth Channel into two parts: The northern part, including Ziegelbrücke railway station, is located in the municipality of Schänis in the canton of St. Gallen. The southern part, on the other side of the Linth, is located in the canton of Glarus in the municipality of Glarus Nord.

History and Economics 
At the former Roman tariff station, near the Maag and Linth rivers between Lake Walen (Walensee) and Lake Zürich (Zürichsee), a Mercury statue was found. The center of the village is situated on the territory of the canton of Glarus around Fritz & Caspar Jenny AG, a spinning and weaving factoring established in 1833, and which is part of the Inventory of Swiss Heritage Sites. The vocational school of Glarus is also situated in the Glarus part of Ziegelbrücke. On the side of the canton of St. Gallen, Ziegelbrücke railway station is located; around 70 people are living and working there.

Transportation 

Ziegelbrücke railway station, located north of the Linth Channel in the canton of St. Gallen, is a nodal point on the Lake Zürich left bank line, the Ziegelbrücke–Sargans line and the Rapperswil–Ziegelbrücke line.

In addition, the Postauto and local  bus lines connect the communities in the See-Gaster Wahlkreis and the municipalities of Bilten and Niederurnen.

References

External links 

 Niederurnen official website 
 Schänis official website 

Villages in the canton of Glarus
Villages in the canton of St. Gallen